The World First Class University and First Class Academic Discipline Construction, together known as Double First Class, is a tertiary education development initiative designed by the People's Republic of China central government in 2015, which aims to comprehensively develop elite Chinese universities into world-class institutions by the end of 2050 through developing and strengthening their individual faculty departments. The Double First-Class University Plan has made new arrangements for the Chinese higher education institution development. The universities included in this plan are called Double First Class Universities.

The Double First-Class Universities are considered to be the most elite institutions of Chinese tertiary education, representing the top 5% of overall universities and colleges in Mainland China (approximately 3,000 higher education institutions).

History 
In October 2015, the State Council of China published the 'Overall Plan for Promoting the Construction of World First Class Universities and First Class Disciplines' (Double First Class University Plan), which made new arrangements for the development of higher education in China, replacing previous higher education projects.

In June 2016, the Ministry of Education of China announced that the Project 211 and Project 985 had been abolished and replaced by the Double First Class University Initiative.

In September 2017, the full list of the universities and their disciplines of the Double First Class University Plan was jointly published by the Ministry of Education of China, the Ministry of Finance of China and the National Development and Reform Commission of China. According to the list, 140 universities have been approved as ‘Double First Class Universities’ by the State Council of China. The Double First Class University Plan underlines that driving the overall development of universities by building and strengthening their faculties and departments, and eventually developing the 140 listed elite universities into world-class universities by 2050.

The Double First Class University Plan represents a new way of ranking universities in China. By 2021, the 140 Double First Class Universities accounted for roughly 4.65% of the 3,012 universities and colleges in Mainland China, representing the most elite part of higher education institutions in this country.

In December 2021, the 23rd meeting of Central Comprehensively Deepening Reforms Commission chaired by General Secretary of the Chinese Communist Party Xi Jinping deliberated and approved 'Some Suggestions on Further Promoting the Construction of World First Class Universities and First Class Disciplines'.  

In February 2022,  the 'Some Suggestions on Further Promoting the Construction of World First Class Universities and First Class Disciplines' were jointly published by the Ministry of Education, the Ministry of Finance, and the National Development and Reform Commission. In addition, with the approval of the State Council of China, the updated list of "Double First Class Universities" has been released. According to the Phase 2 List of the Double First Class University Plan, the previous university classifications have been abolished, and a total number of 147 universities have been included in the plan (accounted for 4.88% of 3,012 Chinese higher education institutions), after 7 universities newly adding into the list since February 2022.

Double First Class Universities 

The Phase 1 list of 140 Double First Class Universities were issued by Chinese Ministry of Education, Ministry of Finance, and National Development and Reform Commission without any ranking within the lists (by "school code") in 2017. In February 2022, the Ministry of Education of China announced that the classifications had been invalidated, and the universities included in the Double First Class University Plan would be referred to as Double First Class Universities. According to the updated Phase 2 list of the Double First Class University Plan (without any ranking within the list), a total of 147 universities have been approved and recognized as Double First Class Universities, taking up 4.88% of universities and colleges in China.

Double First Class Universities listing follow in alphabetical order 
Anhui University (安徽大学)
Beihang University (北京航空航天大学)
Beijing Foreign Studies University (北京外国语大学)
Beijing Forestry University (北京林业大学)
Beijing Institute of Technology (北京理工大学)
Beijing Jiaotong University (北京交通大学)
Beijing Normal University (北京师范大学)
Beijing Sport University (北京体育大学)
Beijing University of Chemical Technology (北京化工大学)
Beijing University of Chinese Medicine (北京中医药大学)
Beijing University of Posts and Telecommunications (北京邮电大学)
Beijing University of Technology (北京工业大学)
Capital Normal University (首都师范大学)
Central Academy of Drama (中央戏剧学院)
Central Academy of Fine Arts (中央美术学院)
Central China Normal University (华中师范大学)
Central Conservatory of Music (中央音乐学院)
Central South University (中南大学)
Central University of Finance and Economics (中央财经大学)
Chang'an University (长安大学)
Chengdu University of Technology (成都理工大学)
Chengdu University of Traditional Chinese Medicine (成都中医药大学)
China Academy of Art (中国美术学院)
China Agricultural University (中国农业大学)
China Conservatory of Music (中国音乐学院)
China Foreign Affairs University (外交学院)
China Pharmaceutical University (中国药科大学)
China University of Geosciences (中国地质大学(武汉))
China University of Geosciences (Beijing) (中国地质大学(北京))
China University of Mining and Technology (中国矿业大学)
China University of Mining and Technology (Beijing) (中国矿业大学(北京))
China University of Petroleum (Beijing) (中国石油大学(北京))
China University of Petroleum (Huadong) (中国石油大学(华东))
China University of Political Science and Law (中国政法大学)
Chongqing University (重庆大学)
Communication University of China (中国传媒大学)
Dalian Maritime University (大连海事大学)
Dalian University of Technology (大连理工大学)
Donghua University (东华大学)
East China Normal University (华东师范大学)
East China University of Science and Technology (华东理工大学)
Fudan University (复旦大学)
Fuzhou University (福州大学)
Guangxi University (广西大学)
Guangzhou Medical University (广州医科大学) (* newly added in Phase 2)
Guangzhou University of Chinese Medicine (广州中医药大学)
Guizhou University (贵州大学)
Hainan University (海南大学)
Harbin Engineering University (哈尔滨工程大学)
Harbin Institute of Technology (哈尔滨工业大学)
Hebei University of Technology (河北工业大学)
Hefei University of Technology (合肥工业大学)
Henan University (河南大学)
Hohai University (河海大学)
Huazhong Agricultural University (华中农业大学)
Huazhong University of Science and Technology (华中科技大学)
Hunan Normal University (湖南师范大学)
Hunan University (湖南大学)
Inner Mongolia University (内蒙古大学)
Jiangnan University (江南大学)
Jilin University (吉林大学)
Jinan University (暨南大学)
Lanzhou University (兰州大学)
Liaoning University (辽宁大学)
Minzu University of China (中央民族大学)
Nanchang University (南昌大学)
Nanjing Agricultural University (南京农业大学)
Nanjing Forestry University (南京林业大学)
Nanjing Medical University (南京医科大学) (* newly added in Phase 2)
Nanjing Normal University (南京师范大学)
Nanjing University (南京大学)
Nanjing University of Aeronautics and Astronautics (南京航空航天大学)
Nanjing University of Chinese Medicine (南京中医药大学)
Nanjing University of Information Science and Technology (南京信息工程大学)
Nanjing University of Posts and Telecommunications  (南京邮电大学)
Nanjing University of Science and Technology (南京理工大学)
Nankai University (南开大学)
National University of Defense Technology (国防科技大学)
Ningbo University (宁波大学)
Ningxia University (宁夏大学)
North China Electric Power University (华北电力大学)
Northeast Agricultural University (东北农业大学)
Northeast Forestry University (东北林业大学)
Northeast Normal University (东北师范大学)
Northeastern University (东北大学)
Northwest A&F University (西北农林科技大学)
Northwestern Polytechnical University (西北工业大学)
Northwest University (西北大学)
Ocean University of China (中国海洋大学)
Peking Union Medical College (北京协和医学院)
Peking University (北京大学)
People's Public Security University of China (中国人民公安大学)
Qinghai University (青海大学)
Renmin University of China (中国人民大学)
Second Military Medical University (第二军医大学)
Shaanxi Normal University (陕西师范大学)
Shandong University (山东大学)
Shanghai Conservatory of Music (上海音乐学院)
Shanghai International Studies University (上海外国语大学)
Shanghai Jiao Tong University (上海交通大学)
Shanghai Ocean University (上海海洋大学)
ShanghaiTech University (上海科技大学) (* newly added in Phase 2)
Shanghai University (上海大学)
Shanghai University of Finance and Economics (上海财经大学)
Shanghai University of Sport (上海体育学院)
Shanghai University of Traditional Chinese Medicine (上海中医药大学)
Shanxi University (山西大学) (* newly added in Phase 2)
Shihezi University (石河子大学)
Sichuan Agricultural University (四川农业大学)
Sichuan University (四川大学)
Soochow University (苏州大学)
South China Agricultural University (华南农业大学) (* newly added in Phase 2)
South China Normal University (华南师范大学)
South China University of Technology (华南理工大学)
Southeast University (东南大学)
Southern University of Science and Technology (南方科技大学) (* newly added in Phase 2)
Southwest Jiaotong University (西南交通大学)
Southwest Petroleum University (西南石油大学)
Southwest University (西南大学)
Southwestern University of Finance and Economics (西南财经大学)
Sun Yat-sen University (中山大学)
Taiyuan University of Technology (太原理工大学)
The Fourth Military Medical University (第四军医大学)
Tiangong University(Former name: Tianjin Polytechnic University) (天津工业大学)
Tianjin Medical University (天津医科大学)
Tianjin University (天津大学)
Tianjin University of Traditional Chinese Medicine (天津中医药大学)
Tibet University (西藏大学)
Tongji University (同济大学)
Tsinghua University (清华大学)
University of Chinese Academy of Sciences (中国科学院大学)
University of Electronic Science and Technology of China (电子科技大学)
University of International Business and Economics (对外经济贸易大学)
University of Science & Technology Beijing (北京科技大学)
University of Science and Technology of China (中国科学技术大学)
Wuhan University (武汉大学)
Wuhan University of Technology (武汉理工大学)
Xi'an Jiaotong University (西安交通大学)
Xiangtan University (湘潭大学) (* newly added in Phase 2)
Xiamen University (厦门大学)
Xidian University (西安电子科技大学)
Xinjiang University (新疆大学)
Yanbian University (延边大学)
Yunnan University (云南大学)
Zhejiang University (浙江大学)
Zhengzhou University (郑州大学)
Zhongnan University of Economics and Law (中南财经政法大学)

Double First Class Universities listing based on geographical locations 

* represent the newly added universities in the Phase 2 list of Double First Class University Plan.

Assessment and Rankings
The Double First Class University Plan underlines that developing the listed Chinese elite universities into world-class universities by 2050 through strengthening their developments of disciplines and faculties.

On 18 September 2020, the members of "Double First Class" expert valuation group, which was headed by Lin Huiqing, Chairman of the Medical Education Expert Committee of the Ministry of Education and former Vice Minister of the Ministry of Education, unanimously agreed that Tsinghua University has been fully established as a world-class university.

According to the 'Phase 2 List of the Double First-Class University Initiative' jointly published by the Ministry of Education, the Ministry of Finance, and the National Development and Reform Commission in February 2022, 15 Double First-Class Universities (including Beijing University of Chinese Medicine, Inner Mongolia University, Liaoning University, Northeast Normal University, Yanbian University, Shanghai University of Finance and Economics, Ningbo University, Anhui University, Huazhong Normal University, Zhongnan University of Economics and Law, Guangxi University, Tibet University, Ningxia University, Xinjiang University, and The Third Military Medical University) received warnings on their Double First-Class status revocation. These 15 universities are required to rectify and improve their research qualities and development, and if the 15 universities fail to pass the final assessment in 2023, they will lose their Double First-Class University statuses.

See also

 List of universities in China
 Excellence League, an alliance of leading Chinese universities with strong backgrounds in engineering
 Project 985, an abolished project of developing 39 leading research universities in China
 Project 211, an abolished program for developing China's comprehensive universities
 State Key Laboratories, a list of key laboratories receiving support from the central government of the P.R. China
 BRICS Universities League, a consortium of leading research universities from BRICS countries
 Imperial Universities, a grouping of elite older universities in Japan
 Golden Triangle (universities), a group of elite universities in the UK
 Ivy League, a formal grouping of elite private universities in the United States
 Russell Group, a grouping of research intensive universities in the UK
 TU9, alliance of nine leading Technical Universities in Germany
 SKY (universities), a group of prestigious Korean universities
 Canadian U15, a group of 15 research intensive universities in Canada
 Go8, a coalition of 8 research intensive Australian universities

References 

Higher education in China
Universities and colleges in China
Educational projects
College and university associations and consortia in Asia